The 1973 Cal State Northridge  Matadors football team represented California State University, Northridge as a member of the California Collegiate Athletic Association (CCAA) during the 1973 NCAA Division II football season. Led by first-year head coach Gary Torgeson, Cal State Northridge compiled an overall record of 2–9 with a mark of 1–3 in conference play, placing in a three-way tie for third in the CCAA. The team was outscored by its opponents 456 to 200 for the season and allowed over 50 points four times. The Matadors played home games at North Campus Stadium in Northridge, California.

Schedule

References

Cal State Northridge
Cal State Northridge Matadors football seasons
Cal State Northridge Matadors football